Brian Crecente (born July 28, 1970) is an American journalist and columnist. He founded Kotaku, co-founded Polygon, previously served as video games editor at Variety, and was in charge of game coverage at Rolling Stone.

Career 
He began his career as a journalist with the Fort Worth Star-Telegram in 1997, where he covered crime and public safety for daily newspapers in Texas, Florida and Colorado for 12 years. He starting his career as a video game journalist as the founding editor-in-chief of Kotaku, launched in 2004. In 2009, he wrote Good Game, a weekly column internationally syndicated by McClatchy-Tribune Information Services. Crecente was the founding editor and executive editor for Polygon, launched in 2012. 

In July 2017, Crecente announced on Twitter that he would be leaving Polygon for Rolling Stones gaming website Glixel. He was brought on at Variety on April 9, 2018, to expand the entertainment publication's coverage into video gaming with a new vertical that the co-editors say "represents another step forward in our effort to offer great journalism regarding every aspect of the modern media landscape." At the time he was still contributing to Rolling Stones game coverage. Rolling Stone's gaming vertical, Glixel, was shut down later in 2018.

Crecente was laid off from Variety in June 2019, and the gaming section was removed from the Variety masthead. In 2020, Crecente helped launch an official LEGO Games podcast for the LEGO Group entitled Bits N' Bricks to help celebrate the 25-year history of the first LEGO video game. He co-hosts the weekly show which is hosted on LEGO.com. In 2021, Crecente helped launch an official Level Infinite podcast for Tencent Games entitled This is Level Infinite. It explores the creation of the company's games. He co-hosts the weekly show which is hosted on LevelInfinite.com.

Recognition 
In 2018, Crecente received a special recognition from the Society of Professional Journalists for his series on game culture in Cuba. He was also awarded first place for Excellence in eSports Writing that same year by the SPJ for his story on the esports champions of Cuba. Crecente was named one of the 20 most influential people in the video game industry over the past 20 years by GamePro in 2009 and one of gaming's Top 50 journalists by Edge in 2006. He was featured in a 5280 biography.

Personal life
Brian Crecente is married and has a son, Tristan. He is the uncle of Jennifer Ann Crecente, who was murdered in 2006. He was one of the judges on the "Life. Love. Game Design Challenge", a competition designed "to challenge video game designers and developers to create video games about teen dating violence" sponsored by Jennifer Ann's Group, a memorial charity for Jennifer. Crecente attended the University of Maryland, College Park.

Works 

 Good Game, Well Played (collection of his Kotaku and Polygon columns)

References

Further reading

External links
 Pad and Pixel

1970 births
Living people
American bloggers
American critics
American male bloggers
American male journalists
Gawker Media
University of Maryland, College Park alumni
Writers from Denver
Video game critics
21st-century American non-fiction writers
21st-century American journalists